Pionenta ochreata is a moth of the  family Geometridae. It is known from Arizona and New Mexico.

The wingspan is about 26 mm. Adults are on wing from mid May to August in riparian canyons and dry coniferous forest up to 2,560 meters. There is probably more than one generation per year.

External links
 A revision of the genus Antepione Packard with description of the new genus Pionenta Ferris (Lepidoptera, Geometridae, Ennominae)
Images

Ourapterygini